Hooks is the ninth studio album by the Dutch rock and roll and blues group Herman Brood & His Wild Romance. The album reached #28 on the Dutch album chart on 17 June 1989, and stayed on the chart for 10 weeks. Both of the early Wild Romance guitarists, Danny Lademacher and David Hollestelle, play on Hooks.

Track listing

Personnel
Herman Brood - piano, keyboards, vocals
Roy Bakkers - drums
Rudy Engelbert - bass guitar, vocals
David Hollestelle - guitar
Danny Lademacher - guitar, vocals
Christian Ramon - engineer

References 

1989 albums
Herman Brood & His Wild Romance albums
CBS Records albums